Chalkie White or Chalky White may refer to:

 Chalkie White (rugby union), English rugby player and coach
 Chalkie White (swimmer), retired Irish swimmer and swimming coach
 Steve White (footballer) or Chalky White, English footballer
 Chalkie White, a character performed by comedian Jim Davidson
 Chalkie White, a character in the Andy Capp comic strip
 Albert "Chalky" White, a character in Boardwalk Empire